= Deactivation =

Deactivation may refer to:

- Protein denaturation, the process of disrupting the structure of proteins or nucleic acids
- Drug metabolism
- Sterilization (microbiology), the process of killing or deactivating all life and other biological agents, rendering them unable to cause disease, function, or replicate
